Charles Michael Duhig (21 April 1953 – 9 January 2010) was a Canadian actor and radio host.

He is noted for his appearances in television commercials from age 10 and his regular role in the television series Swiss Family Robinson (1974). Although Duhig attracted substantial amounts of fan mail for his work on Swiss Family Robinson, he left acting after the series was cancelled. He later became a presenter at a radio station in Kitchener, Ontario.

Filmography

Television series

References

External links

1953 births
2010 deaths
Canadian male child actors
Canadian male television actors
Canadian radio personalities
Male actors from Toronto